The Sophie May House is a historic house on Sophie May Lane in Norridgewock, Maine.  Built in 1845, it is an excellent local example of Greek Revival architecture, with a classical four-columned Greek temple front.  The house is most notable as the long-time home of Rebecca Sophia Clarke (1833-1906), who wrote a series of popular children's books under the pen name "Sophie May".  The house was listed on the National Register of Historic Places in 1976.

Description and setting
The Sophie May House is set between Sophie May Lane and the Kennebec River to the south, just outside the main village of Norridgewock.   It is a -story brick structure, with a front-facing gable roof, which projects beyond the front facade and is supported by four smooth Doric columns, with a fully pedimented flush-boarded gable end above.  The main facade is three bays wide, with full-length windows in the two left bays and the entrance in the rightmost.  The interior follows a typical side-hall plan, with the main parlor to the left, and kitchen and service area in ells attached to the rear of the house.

The house was built in 1845 by Cullen Sawtelle, a native son who studied law at Bowdoin College and represented the area in Congress in the 1840s.  In 1848 Sawtelle sold the house to Asa Clarke.  Clarke's daughter, Rebecca, was educated at Norridgewock Female Academy and taught primary school in Illinois until advancing deafness forced her return.  From 1861 until her death in 1906 she lived here, where she wrote more than forty volumes of children's stories, using realistic settings and characterizations drawn in part from her hometown, and in contrast to the prevailing style of didactic and moralizing children's literature.

See also
National Register of Historic Places listings in Somerset County, Maine

References

Houses on the National Register of Historic Places in Maine
Greek Revival houses in Maine
Houses completed in 1845
Houses in Somerset County, Maine
Norridgewock, Maine
National Register of Historic Places in Somerset County, Maine